"Mein Baby war beim Frisör" (My baby's been to the hairdresser's) is a punk song by Die Ärzte. It's the second track on and the second single from their 1996 album Le Frisur. The song is musically and by title a reference to the song The KKK Took My Baby Away from the US Punkrock band The Ramones.

Track listing 

 "Mein Baby war beim Frisör" (Urlaub) - 2:16
 "Zusamm'fassung (extended 1-13)" (Gonzalez, Felsenheimer, Urlaub) - 14:38

B-sides 

"Zusamm'fassung" actually consists of 13 different tracks. On the first press from the CD and the 10" maxi single, they're all in one track; on the second press from the CD they are separate, although the back cover lists them as one track ("Zusamm'fassung (Extended 1-13)"). "Zusammenfassung" (Summary), the track of origin of these short tracks, is found on "Le Frisur".

Charts

1996 singles
Die Ärzte songs
Songs written by Farin Urlaub
1996 songs